The Ruins of São Miguel das Missões (Portuguese for 'St. Michael of the Missions'), also known as São Miguel Arcanjo, and by its former Spanish name Misión de San Miguel Arcángel, is a UNESCO World Heritage Site located in the municipality of São Miguel das Missões, in the northwestern region of Rio Grande do Sul state, in southern Brazil.

History
The São Miguel das Missões mission was built between 1735 and around 1745 as Mission San Miguel Arcángel. São Miguel das Missões was one of the many Spanish Colonial Jesuit Reductions in Argentina, Brazil, Paraguay and Bolivia. Spanish Jesuit missionaries founded the mission for Crown mandated Indian Reductions for Guaraní Indians, which had the goal of converting them to Christianity and protecting locals from the Portuguese slave traders known as the Bandeirantes.

The Treaty of Madrid in 1750 transferred sovereignty over the area from Spain to Portugal. The Spanish Jesuit missions were ordered to move to the retained Spanish territory west of the Uruguay River. The Guaraní tribes refused to comply with the order to relocate from their homelands, now deemed in Portuguese "territory", which led to the Guarani War. A joint Portuguese-Spanish army attacked and defeated the Guaraní, and the mission was destroyed.

The cathedral (Catedral Angelopolitana) built in the 1920s in nearby Santo Ângelo city, is modeled after the church at the São Miguel das Missões reduction.

World Heritage Site

The Spanish Colonial architecture of the ruins and the archeological site of São Miguel das Missões has been a protected part of the UNESCO Jesuit Missions of the Guaranis World Heritage Site, since 1984. A history museum is adjacent.

See also
 The Mission (1986) — film starring Robert De Niro and Jeremy Irons, about the Jesuit Missions and the Guaraní War. The film set represented what is known of the appearance of the 18th-century São Miguel das Missões.
 Guarani War
 Jesuit Reductions
 List of Jesuit sites
 San Ignacio Miní
 Spanish missions in South America

References

External links

Spanish missions in Brazil
Buildings and structures in Rio Grande do Sul
Jesuit history in South America
Portuguese colonization of the Americas
Tourist attractions in Rio Grande do Sul
World Heritage Sites in Brazil